John Francis Gillen Sr. (born November 5, 1958) is a former American football linebacker who played with the St. Louis Cardinals and the New England Patriots of the National Football League, as well as the Chicago Blitz and the Arizona Outlaws of the United States Football League. He played college football at Illinois.

Early life 
Gillen was born in Arlington Heights, Illinois, and attended St. Viator High School, where he lettered in football, basketball, and track. He was the MVP of his high school football team and was honored as an all-state linebacker. He graduated from the school in 1977.

College years 
From 1977 to 1981, Gillen was a starter at middle linebacker for the Illinois Fighting Illini. He led the team in tackles for three years and was the defensive captain for two. In 1980, he received All-Big Ten honors and was voted the most valuable defensive player at Illinois. He played in the 1981 Senior Bowl.

Professional football career

St. Louis Cardinals 
Gillen was drafted by the St. Louis Cardinals in the fifth round of the 1981 NFL Draft, with the 116th pick overall. During the 1981 season, Gillen played in all 16 games.

He was injured before the 1982 season and was placed on injured reserve in September 1982. By December, he was able to play again, and appeared in the team's last four regular season games as well as their first and only playoff game, a 41–16 loss to the Green Bay Packers.

New England Patriots 
Gillen played eight games with the New England Patriots in 1983. His last appearance in an NFL game was a November 20, 1983 home game against the Cleveland Browns, in which the Patriots were shut out 30–0.

Chicago Blitz 
In 1984, Gillen headed to the United States Football League, where he played the rest of his professional career. He joined the Chicago Blitz that year, where he played middle linebacker and was used once on a kickoff return for 11 yards.

Arizona Outlaws 
In 1985, Gillen played with the USFL's Arizona Outlaws, alongside his younger brother Ken.

Personal life 
Gillen lives in Glen Ellyn, Illinois, with his wife, Wendy, and three children, John, Conor, and Grace. Both of his sons played college football: John for the Wisconsin Badgers and Conor for the Fighting Illini.

References 

Living people
1958 births

American football linebackers
Arizona Outlaws players
Chicago Blitz players
Illinois Fighting Illini football players
New England Patriots players
St. Louis Cardinals (football) players
People from Arlington Heights, Illinois
Players of American football from Illinois